Bobrowo may refer to the following places:
Bobrowo, Gmina Golina in Greater Poland Voivodeship (west-central Poland)
Bobrowo, Gmina Rzgów in Greater Poland Voivodeship (west-central Poland)
Bobrowo, Kuyavian-Pomeranian Voivodeship (north-central Poland)
Bobrowo, Warmian-Masurian Voivodeship (north Poland)
Bobrowo, West Pomeranian Voivodeship (north-west Poland)